Magnetic Hill School is a K-8 school in Lutes Mountain, New Brunswick, Canada.

Today's Parent named it one of the top 40 schools in Canada, and former principal Carolyn Norman was named as one of Canada’s Outstanding Principals in 2005 by The Learning Partnership and the Canadian Association of Principals. Magnetic Hill continues to be a high achieving school with many ongoing community partnerships and programs.

History
The school received media coverage in the early 1990s when one of its teachers, Malcolm Ross, was involved in a human rights complaint by a local Jewish parent. Ross had published and distributed anti-Semitic literature, including Holocaust denial. The case eventually led to Ross being dismissed from his teaching job, but was made the school's librarian, because it was a non-teaching job.

References

External links
 Official School Website
 Anglophone East School District
 Picture of Magnetic Hill School

Middle schools in New Brunswick
Schools in Westmorland County, New Brunswick